Liviu Goian (born 18 November 1965) is a Romanian former footballer who played as a defender. After ending his playing career, he worked as a sports agent, president at SC Bacău and became a businessman. Liviu's brothers Gigi, Lucian and Dorin were also professional footballers, all of them having played in the Romanian top-division Divizia A. He also has three sisters.

Honours
CSM Suceava
Divizia B: 1986–87
Debrecen
Magyar Kupa: 1998–99

Notes

References

1965 births
Living people
Romanian footballers
Association football defenders
Liga I players
Liga II players
Nemzeti Bajnokság I players
FCM Bacău players
Debreceni VSC players
Romanian expatriate footballers
Expatriate footballers in Hungary
Expatriate sportspeople in Hungary
Romanian expatriates in Hungary
Romanian expatriate sportspeople in Hungary
Romanian sports executives and administrators
Association football agents
Romanian businesspeople
People from Dej